The 2007 Warwick District Council election took place on 3 May 2007 to elect members of Warwick District Council in Warwickshire, England. The whole council was up for election with boundary changes since the last election in 2003. The Conservative Party gained overall control of the council from no overall control.

Election result

Ward results

References

2007
2007 English local elections
2000s in Warwickshire